WACD (106.1 FM) is a radio station broadcasting a country music format. Licensed to Antigo, Wisconsin, U.S., the station is currently owned by Results Broadcasting, Inc. and features programming from ABC Radio.

References

External links

ACD
Country radio stations in the United States
Radio stations established in 1995